Liangmaqiao Station is a subway station on Line 10 of the Beijing Subway. It is located next to the Lufthansa Center in Chaoyang district, and is the closest subway station to many embassies and embassy housing complexes, including those of the United States, India Israel, Japan, Germany, South Korea, Brunei and France. The station handled a peak entry and exit traffic of 89,800 people on May 5, 2013.

Station layout 
The station has an underground island platform.

Exits 
There are 4 exits, lettered A, B, C, and D. Exits A and B are accessible.

References

External links

Beijing Subway stations in Chaoyang District
Railway stations in China opened in 2008